The rivalry between RCD Mallorca and CD Atlético Baleares, clubs based in Palma de Mallorca (Mallorca, Balearic Islands, Spain) is known as the Palma derby or derbi palmesano.

History 

Both clubs are, by far, the oldest in the capital of the Balearic Islands (the rest were founded from the mid-1960s) and have had a bitter rivalry owing to the social status of their respective founders. While RCD Mallorca (then called Real Sociedad Alfonso XIII FC) was considered the team of the powerful, CD Atlético Baleares (then Baleares FC) was born from workers and workers sectors of the city. This character is very diluted at present and both clubs are much more heterogeneous than in the beginning, but the foundational character is still very present when defining the rivalry between groups of supporters.

Their rivalry has remained very alive at street level, despite being clubs at very different sporting levels from the 1960s onwards - and especially since the 1980s, when Mallorca made a significant improvement and became a regular in the Primera and Segunda Divisions, while Atlético Baleares remained in the lower Segunda Division B and Tercera División.

The first confrontation took place on March 13, 1921 between the second team of Alfonso XIII FC and the first of Baleares FC in the stadium of Bons Aires, property of the alfonsinos. The match ended early in the midst of a pitched battle between players and the public through, when the alfonsinos won by 2 goals to 1.

The rivalry has been maintained for almost a century through the successive names of the two clubs. By the mallorcanists, RS Alfonso XIII FC (from 1916 to 1931), CD Mallorca (1931-1949) and RCD Mallorca (since 1949). On the part of the balearics, Baleares FC (from 1920 to 1942) and CD Atlético Baleares (since 1942).

At the supramunicipal level, for a time two clubs shared rivalry with a third team: the CD Constancia of the neighboring population of Inca, especially until the 1960s. In the other  islands of the Balearic archipelago, the main rivals were SD Ibiza (from the capital of the Pityusic Islands, Ibiza) and UD Mahón (from the capital of Minorca). The aforementioned rise in sporting achievement that RCD Mallorca had from the 1960s reduced all these rivalries to a minimum, except that with Atlético Baleares.

The last derby, played in 2018 in Segunda División B, aroused great excitement and showed that the rivalry is still very much alive.

League matches 

Only clashes between first teams are listed. Therefore, the confrontations of Atlético Baleares against the RCD Mallorca subsidiaries (first Mallorca Atlético and currently RCD Mallorca B) are not included.

Copa del Rey 
Only clashes between first teams are listed. Therefore, the confrontations of Atlético Baleares against the RCD Mallorca subsidiaries (first Mallorca Atlético and currently RCD Mallorca B) are not included.

Other tournaments 
Only clashes between first teams are listed. Therefore, the confrontations of Atlético Baleares against the RCD Mallorca subsidiaries (first Mallorca Atlético and currently RCD Mallorca B) are not included.

(*) RCD Mallorca won on penalties.

Bibliography 

 García Gargallo, Manuel: Campeonatos regionales de Baleares. Orígenes y desarrollo 1900-1940. CIHEFE: Oviedo, 2018. .
 García Gargallo, Manuel: Els origens de l'Atlètic Balears (1920-1942). Dels inicis a la fusió. Lulú: Barcelona, 2013.
 García Gargallo, Manuel: L'Atlètic Balears (1920-1942): Els primers anys d'una entitat centenària. Documenta Balear: Palma, 2020. 
 Pasamontes, Juan Carlos: R.S. Alfonso XIII. La cara oculta del Real CD Mallorca. 1916-1931. Palma: Edicions Cort, 2005. DL PM 1427-2005. .
 Ramis Fernández, Xesc: El derbi de Palma. Historia de una rivalidad vecinal. futboldesdemallorca.com, 2017 
 Salas Fuster, Antoni: L'Atlètic Baleares. Una història de supervivència. Palma: Ingrama SA (impr.), 2009. .
 Vidal Perelló, Miquel; Vidal Reynés, Jordi: Història del RCD Mallorca (1916-2004). Palma: Documenta Balear, 2005. Fundació Reial Mallorca. Col. Arbre de Mar, núm. 17. 2005. .
 Vidal Perelló, Miquel; Vidal Reynés, Jordi: Un siglo con el RCD Mallorca 1916-2016. Palma: Comisión Centenario del Real Mallorca, 2016. .

References

Football rivalries in Spain
RCD Mallorca
CD Atlético Baleares
Football in the Balearic Islands
Recurring sporting events established in 1921